The winners of the 2004 Internet Movie/Television Awards, given by the Internet Entertainment Writers Association, are listed below.

Movie Awards
Internet Movie Awards 2004
2004
The winners of the Internet Movie Awards:

Favorite Actor in a Leading Role: Johnny Depp - Finding Neverland
Favorite Actor in a Supporting Role: Clive Owen - Closer
Favorite Actress in a Leading Role: Natalie Portman - Garden State
Favorite Actress in a Supporting Role: Natalie Portman - Closer
Favorite Director: Michel Gondry - Eternal Sunshine of the Spotless Mind
Favorite Picture: Eternal Sunshine of the Spotless Mind
Favorite Screenplay: Garden State - Zach Braff
Favorite Song: "Let Go" by Frou Frou - Garden State
Favorite Soundtrack or Musical Score: Garden State
Favorite Visual Effects: Eternal Sunshine of the Spotless Mind
Breakthrough Performance: Zach Braff - Garden State
Worst Picture: Catwoman

Television Awards
Internet Television Awards 2004
2004
Drama Series:

Comedy Series:
The winners of the Internet Television Awards:

Favorite Primetime Comedy Series: Friends
Favorite Primetime Drama Series: Alias
Favorite Primetime Non-scripted Reality or Game Series: American Idol
Favorite Late Night Variety Programming: The Tonight Show with Jay Leno
Favorite Actor in a Primetime Comedy Series: Matt LeBlanc - Friends
Favorite Actor in a Primetime Drama Series: Kiefer Sutherland - 24
Favorite Actress in a Primetime Comedy Series: Jennifer Aniston - Friends
Favorite Actress in a Primetime Drama Series: Jennifer Garner - Alias

 

2004 film awards
2004 television awards